"Je ne parle pas français" is a song by German singer Namika featuring French rapper Black M released on 13 April 2018.

Charts

Certifications

References

2018 songs
2018 singles
Number-one singles in Germany